The Shandong (Shantung) Peninsula or Jiaodong (Chiaotung) Peninsula is a peninsula in Shandong Province in eastern China, between the Bohai Sea to the north and the Yellow Sea to the south. The latter name refers to the east and Jiaozhou.

Geography
The waters bordering the peninsula are Laizhou Bay to the northwest, which opens into the Bohai Sea to the north, which in turn passes through the Bohai Strait to the northeast into the Yellow Sea to the east and south. The peninsula's territory comprises three prefecture-level cities of Shandong: Qingdao in the southwest, Yantai in the north and centre, and Weihai at the eastern tip. 

Shandong Peninsula is the largest peninsula in China. Stretching into the Bohai Sea and the Yellow Sea, it is 290 kilometers long from east to west, 190 kilometers wide from north to south, and 50 kilometers narrow. The total area of Shandong Peninsula is 73,000 square kilometers. 

Geologically it was once connected to the Korean Peninsula and the Liaodong Peninsula, but was split starting around 27 Ma ago, resulting in the formation of the Yellow Sea.

History

In the Paleolithic, the Shandong Peninsula area was covered by forest. In the Neolithic, about 7,000 years ago, a large number of Dongyi people inhabited the peninsula. The peninsula later belonged to the Shang dynasty. The State of Qi built the Great Wall of Qi, which is partially on the peninsula. 
The Kiautschou Bay Leased Territory was a leased territory of the German Empire from 1898 to 1914 located around Jiaozhou Bay, where the village of Qingdao (Tsingtao) developed into a major seaport. 

Japan seized the territory from Germany in 1914 in the First World War. In the 1919 Treaty of Versailles, Germany lost Qingdao and its sphere of influence in Shandong. Instead of restoring Chinese sovereignty over the area, the treaty transferred the leased territory to the Empire of Japan. This resulted in popular dissatisfaction with the outcome, known as the Shandong Problem, and led to the May Fourth Movement. Eventually, Shandong was reverted to Chinese control in 1922 after mediation by the United States during the Washington Naval Conference. However, Japan retained economic influence in the area.

Due to geographical reasons, the Shandong Peninsula is closely connected with Northeast China and South Korea. Historically, a large number of people migrated to the Northeast by boat, whereas in the present day many people from the Northeast "return" to the Shandong Peninsula. After the People's Republic of China established diplomatic relations with South Korea in 1992, a large number of South Korean companies also set up factories in the region. There are more than 200,000 Koreans living in the Shandong Peninsula. South Korea has a consulate-general in Qingdao .

Natural climate 
Shandong Peninsula is surrounded by sea on three sides and has a temperate monsoon climate with four distinct seasons. Due to the influence of the ocean, compared with the same latitude of the inland climate mild, summer without heat, winter without cold.

Shandong Peninsula coast winding, harbor staggered, islands list, is the North China coastal good port concentration area. Qingdao in Jiaozhou Bay, Yantai in Zhifu Bay, Weihai in Weiwan, Shidao in Shidao Bay and Longkou are all famous ports in China. Shandong Peninsula is a warm temperate humid monsoon climate. About 60% of the annual precipitation is concentrated in summer, and the intensity is high, often heavy rain.

The allusions 
During Chinese history like the Spring and Autumn Period or the Han and Tang Dynasties, many famous historical figures appeared near or at the Shandong Peninsula. sun wu and sun tzu, sun bin,  the doctor chun yuyi  "The Methods of the Sima was written near here also With their thoughts, conduct, speech and writings, these sages created a culture of gentleman that has been passed down through the ages on the Shandong Peninsula.

the First Emperor of Qin had five Tours in his twelve years, three of which were to the Shandong Peninsula. Xu Fu a man from Qi was sent by the Qin emperor to find immortality near the sea of Japan he had many provisions and men even children but he disappeared he is a famous navigator sorcerer and alchemist depicted in legend and narratives in China and Japan to have become a immortal and from this it is quoted in theater and in verse. Emperor Wudi of the Han Dynasty made seven sea cruises, all of which came to the Shandong Peninsula. The Shandong Peninsula has laid the foundation of China's maritime industry and also the foundation of China's maritime culture.

Major urban areas

In popular culture
The Shandong Peninsula is fictionalized as the "Chinese Peninsula" in the Japanese manga and anime series, Fire Force.

See also 
 Geography of China

References 

4. 傅广典．山东半岛地域文化的界定、内涵及其传承趋向：《民间文化论坛》，2006 (2) ：59-63

5. 陈杰．从考古资料看先秦时期山东半岛先民的海洋经济生活：《文博》 ，2007 (6) ：16-21

Peninsulas of China
Landforms of Shandong